During the First World War, the Second Battle of Ypres was fought from  for control of the tactically important high ground to the east and south of the Flemish town of Ypres in western Belgium. The First Battle of Ypres had been fought the previous autumn. The Second Battle of Ypres was the first mass use by Germany of poison gas on the Western Front.

Background

The eminent German chemist Walther Nernst, who was in the army in 1914 as a volunteer driver, saw how trenches produced deadlock. He proposed to Colonel Max Bauer, the German general staff officer responsible for liaison with scientists, that they could empty the opposing trenches by a surprise attack with tear gas. Observing a field test of this idea, the chemist Fritz Haber instead proposed using heavier-than-air chlorine gas

The German commander Erich von Falkenhayn agreed to try the new weapon, but intended to use it in a diversionary attack by his 4th Army. Falkenhayn wanted to use the gas to cover the withdrawal of Imperial German Army units to the Eastern Front to assist its ally Austria-Hungary in the Gorlice–Tarnów offensive against the Russian Empire. The gas would be released by siphoning liquid chlorine out of cylinders; the gas could not be released directly because the valves would freeze; wind would carry the gas to the enemy lines. 5730 gas cylinders, the largest weighing  each, were carried into the front line. Installation was supervised by Haber, Otto Hahn, James Franck and Gustav Hertz. Twice cylinders were breached by shell fire, the second time three men were killed and fifty wounded. Some of the Germans were protected by miners's oxygen breathing apparatus.

The Ypres salient was selected for the attack. It followed the canal, bulging eastward around the town. North of the salient, the Belgian army held the line of the Yser and the north end of the salient was held by two French divisions. The eastern part of the salient was defended by the Canadian and two British divisions. The II Corps and V Corps of the Second Army comprised the 1st, 2nd and 3rd Cavalry Divisions and the 4th, 27th, 28th, Northumbrian, Lahore and 1st Canadian divisions.

Battle
In A record of the Engagements of the British Armies in France and Flanders, 1914–1918 (1923 [1990]) E. A. James used The Official Names of the Battles and Other Engagements Fought by the Military Forces of the British Empire during the Great War, 1914–1919, and the Third Afghan War, 1919: Report of the Battles Nomenclature Committee as approved by the Army Council (1921) to provide a summary of each engagement and the formations involved. In The Battles of Ypres, 1915 six engagements involving the Second Army were recorded, four during the Second Battle (22 April – 25 May).
 Battle of Gravenstafel: 
 Battle of St. Julien: 
 Battle of Frezenberg: 
 Battle of Bellewaarde:

Battle of Gravenstafel Ridge (22–23 April 1915)

The French troops in the path of the gas cloud suffered  with  fatalities. Troops fled in all directions,

A  gap in the French front was left undefended. German infantry followed well behind the cloud, breathing through cotton pads soaked with sodium thiosulfate solution, and occupied the villages of Langemark and Pilkem, where they dug in, even though they might have occupied Ypres almost unopposed. They had taken 2,000 prisoners and 51 guns. Canadian troops defending the southern flank of the break-in identified chlorine because it smelled like their drinking water. The Germans released more chlorine gas at them the following day. Casualties were especially heavy for the 13th Battalion of the Canadian Expeditionary Force (CEF), which was enveloped on three sides and had over-extended its left flank after the Algerian Division broke.

In an action at Kitcheners' Wood, the 10th Battalion of the 2nd Canadian Brigade was ordered to counter-attack in the gap created by the gas attack. They formed up after  on 22 April, with the 16th Battalion (Canadian Scottish) of the 3rd Brigade arriving to support the advance. Engaged by small-arms fire from the wood, they began an impromptu bayonet charge. The attack cleared the former oak plantation of Germans at a 75 per cent casualty rate. The British press were confused by the attack:

The Germans reported that they treated 200 gas casualties, 12 of whom died. The Allies reported 5,000 killed and 15,000 wounded.

Within days the British were advised by John Scott Haldane to counter the effects of the gas by urinating into a cloth and breathing through it. Both sides set about developing more effective gas masks.

Battle of St. Julien (24 April – 5 May)
The village of St. Julien (now Sint-Juliaan) was in the rear of the 1st Canadian Division until the poison-gas attack of 22 April, when it became the front line. Some of the first fighting in the village involved the stand of lance corporal Frederick Fisher of the 13th Battalion CEF's machine-gun detachment; Fisher went out twice with a handful of men and a Colt machine gun, preventing advancing German troops from passing through St. Julien into the rear of the Canadian front line. He was killed the following day.

On the morning of 24 April, the Germans released another gas cloud towards the re-formed Canadian line just west of St. Julien. Word was passed to the troops to urinate on their handkerchiefs and place them over their nose and mouth. The countermeasures were insufficient, and German troops took the village. The next day the York and Durham Brigade units of the Northumberland Division counter-attacked, failing to secure their objectives but establishing a new line closer to the village. On 26 April 4, 6 and 7 Battalions, the Northumberland Brigade, the first Territorial brigade to go into action, attacked and gained a foothold in the village but were forced back, having suffered  Despite hundreds of casualties, the 2nd Battalion Royal Dublin Fusiliers participated without respite in the battles at Frezenberg and Bellewaarde. On 24 April the battalion, subjected to a German gas attack near St. Julien, was nearly annihilated.

The German Army first used chlorine-gas cylinders in April 1915 against the French Army at Ypres, when yellow-green clouds drifted towards the Allied trenches. The gas had a distinctive odour, resembling pineapple and pepper. The French officers, assuming at first that the German infantry were advancing behind a smoke screen, alerted the troops. When the gas reached the front Allied trenches, soldiers began to complain of chest pains and a burning sensation in the throat.

Captain Francis Scrimger of the 2nd Canadian Field Ambulance may have passed the order to use urine to counteract the gas, on the advice of Lieutenant-Colonel George Gallie Nasmith. Soldiers realised they were being gassed and many ran as fast as they could. An hour after the attack began, there was a  gap in the Allied line. Fearing the chlorine, few German soldiers moved forward and the delay enabled Canadian and British troops to retake the position before the Germans could exploit the gap.

After the first German chlorine-gas attacks, Allied troops were supplied with masks of cotton pads soaked in urine; it had been discovered that the urea in the pad neutralised the chlorine. The pads were held over the face until the gas dispersed. Other soldiers preferred to use a handkerchief, sock or flannel body-belt, dampened with a sodium-bicarbonate solution and tied across the mouth and nose, until the gas passed. Soldiers found it difficult to fight like this, and attempts were made to develop a better means of protection against gas attacks. By July 1915, soldiers received efficient gas masks and anti-asphyxiation respirators. Private W. Hay of the Royal Scots arrived in Ypres just after the chlorine-gas attack on 22 April 1915:

Battle of Frezenberg (8–13 May)

The Germans moved field artillery forward, placing three army corps opposite the 27th and 28th Divisions on the Frezenberg ridge. The German attack began on 8 May with a bombardment of the 83rd Brigade in trenches on the forward slope of the ridge, but the first and second infantry assaults were repelled by the survivors. However, the third German assault of the morning pushed the defenders back. Although the neighbouring 80th Brigade repulsed the attack, the 84th Brigade was pushed back; this left a  gap in the line. The Germans were prevented from advancing further by Princess Patricia's Canadian Light Infantry (PPCLI)'s counter-attacks and a night move by the 10th Brigade. The PPCLI held the line at a steep cost; their 700-man force was reduced to 150, who were in no shape to fight. After this, their unofficial motto—"Holding up the whole damn line"—is still used today.

Battle of Bellewaarde (24–25 May)
On 24 May the Germans released a gas attack that hit Shell Trap Farm and to the area around the north west, which was affected the most by the attack. A report of the event by Captain Thomas Leahy, of the 2nd Royal Dublin Fusiliers, shows that their C.O. Lieutenant Colonel Arthur Loveband suspected a gas attack and had warned all company officers. Later the Germans threw up red lights over their trench, which would signal a gas release.

German forces managed to advance and occupy the British line to north and left of the Battalion. The Battalion was now under heavy fire from the German forces. But with shellfire and the aid from the 9th Argyll and Sutherland Highlanders they managed to hold their trenches to the end.

Aftermath

Analysis
By the end of the battle, British forces had withdrawn to a new line 3 miles closer to Ypres, thereby resulting in a compression of its surrounding salient. The city, bombarded by artillery fire, was demolished. Although poison gas had been used on the Eastern Front, it surprised the Allies and about 7,000 gas casualties were transported in field ambulances and treated in casualty clearing stations. In May and June, 350 British deaths were recorded from gas poisoning. Both sides developed gas weapons and counter-measures, which changed the nature of gas warfare; the French and British used gas at the Battle of Loos in late September. Gas protection was somewhat improved with the issue of improvised respirators made from cotton waste pads impregnated with sodium hyposulphite, sodium bicarbonate and glycerin. The respirators made little difference, however, due to lack of training and the use of local contraptions and poorly made items imported from Britain. The "P helmet" (or "Tube Helmet") soaked in sodium phenate was issued by December 1915, and the PH helmet (effective against phosgene) was issued in early 1916.

Although many French troops ran for their lives, others stood their ground and waited for the cloud to pass. Field Marshal Sir John French, Commander-in-Chief of the British Expeditionary Force, wrote,

The Canadian Division mounted an effective defence but had 5,975 casualties by its withdrawal on 3 May. The division was unprepared for the warfare prevailing on the Western Front, where linear tactics were ineffective against attackers armed with magazine rifles and machine guns. The Canadian field artillery had been effective but the deficiencies of the Ross rifle worsened tactical difficulties. The Canadian Division received several thousand replacements shortly after the battle. At Second Ypres, the smallest tactical unit in the infantry was a company; by 1917 it would be the section. The Canadians were employed offensively later in 1915 but not successfully. The battle was the beginning of a long period of analysis and experiment to improve the effectiveness of Canadian infantry weapons, artillery and liaison between infantry and artillery.

Casualties
In the British Official History, J. E. Edmonds and G. C. Wynne recorded British losses of 59,275 casualties, the French about 18,000 casualties on 22 April and another 3,973 from  Canadian casualties from 22 April to 3 May were 5,975, of whom about 1,000 men were killed. The worst day was 24 April, when  were suffered during infantry attacks, artillery bombardments and gas discharges. In 2003, Clayton wrote that thousands of men of the 45th and 87th divisions ran from the gas but that the number of casualties was low. The Germans overran both divisions' artillery but the survivors rallied and held a new line further back. In 2010, Humphries and Maker, in their translated edition of Der Weltkrieg recorded that by 9 May, there had been more than 35,000 German casualties, 59,275 British between 22 April and 31 May and very many French casualties, 18,000 on 22 April alone. In 2012, Sheldon gave similar figures and in 2014, Greenhalgh wrote that French casualties had been exaggerated by propaganda against German "frightfulness" and that in 1998, Olivier Lepick had estimated that  were killed by gas in April out of  casualties.

Lance Sergeant Elmer Cotton described the effects of chlorine gas,

Subsequent operations
The Battle of Mont Sorrel  took place south of Ypres with the 20th Division (XIV Corps) and the 1st, 2nd and 3rd Canadian divisions of the Canadian Corps. The Third Battle of Ypres, also known as the Battle of Passchendaele, was fought from 31 July to 10 November 1917.

Commemoration

Canadian participation in the Battle of Gravenstafel is commemorated on the Saint Julien Memorial in the village. During the Second Battle of Ypres, Lt. Col. John McCrae M.D. of Guelph wrote "In Flanders Fields" in the voice of those who perished in the war. Published in Punch 8 December 1915, the poem is still recited on Remembrance Day and Memorial Day.

Victoria Cross recipients
 Lance Sergeant D. W. Belcher, London Rifle Brigade (TF), 11th Brigade, 4th Division
 Captain E. D. Bellew, 7th Battalion, British Columbia Regiment, 2nd Canadian Brigade, 1st Canadian Division
 Jemadar Mir Dast, 55th Rifles (att. 57th Rifles), Ferozepore Brigade, Lahore Division
 Lance Corporal F. Fisher, 13th Battalion Royal Highlanders of Canada, 3rd Canadian Brigade, 1st Canadian Division
 Company Sergeant-Major F. W. Hall, 8th Battalion, Winnipeg Rifles, 2nd Canadian Brigade
 Private J. Lynn, 2nd Lancashire Fusiliers, 12th Brigade, 4th Division
 2nd Lieutenant W. B. Rhodes-Moorhouse, 2 Squadron, Royal Flying Corps
 Captain F. A. C. Scrimger (Canadian Army Medical Service), 14th Battalion, Royal Montreal Regiment
 Corporal I. Smith, 1st Manchesters, Jullundur Brigade, Lahore Division
 Private E. Warner, 1st Bedfordshires, 15th Brigade, 5th Division

See also

 First Battle of Ypres
 Chemical weapons in World War I
 Saint Julien Memorial
 Battle of Passchendaele
 List of Canadian battles during the First World War

Notes

Footnotes

References

Books
 
 
 
 
 
 
 
 
 
 
 
 
 
 
 
 
 

Journals

Further reading

External links

 Spencer Jones Battles of Ypres
 Kitchener's Wood Memorial
 Second Battle of Ypres Overview
 Historical film documents on the Battles of Ypres
 Order of Battle
 Chlorine, Ucc.ie
 4th Territorial Battalion, Northumberland Fusiliers
 Legion Magazine Online

Battles of World War I involving Canada
Battles of World War I involving Germany
Battles of World War I involving Belgium
Battles of World War I involving France
Battles of World War I involving British India
Battles of World War I involving the United Kingdom
Battles of the Western Front (World War I)
Ypres Salient
Conflicts in 1915
1915 in Belgium
Battle honours of the Rifle Brigade
Military operations of World War I involving chemical weapons
April 1915 events
May 1915 events